Anna McGarrigle, CM (born December 4, 1944) is a Canadian folk music singer and songwriter who recorded and performed with her sister, Kate McGarrigle, who died in 2010.

Early life
Anna McGarrigle studied at the École des beaux-arts de Montréal (1964-1968).

Music career
In the 1960s, Montreal natives Kate and Anna McGarrigle established themselves in Montreal's burgeoning folk scene while they attended school. From 1963 to 1967, they teamed up with Jack Nissenson and Peter Weldon to form the folk group Mountain City Four. The sisters wrote, recorded and performed music into the twenty-first century with assorted accompanying musicians, including Chaim Tannenbaum and Joel Zifkin.

McGarrigle was also a songwriter; her song "Heart Like a Wheel" was the title track of Linda Ronstadt's 1974 album, and her song "Cool River" was recorded by Maria Muldaur.

In 2016 Anna and her older sister Jane wrote a book together, Mountain City Girls.

Personal life
McGarrigle married journalist Dane Lanken on August 25, 1977, in Hawkesbury, Ontario. She and Lanken have two children, Sylvan (b. 1977) and Lily (b. 1979).

Awards
Kate and Anna's 1976 debut album Kate & Anna McGarrigle was chosen by Melody Maker as Best Record of the Year. In 1993 she was made a Member of the Order of Canada.

The duo's albums Matapedia (1996) and The McGarrigle Hour (1998) won Juno Awards. In 1999 Kate and Anna received Women of Originality awards and in 2006 SOCAN Lifetime Achievement awards.

In 2017 she was presented with a Quebec Arts and Letters Award.

Discography
 Kate & Anna McGarrigle (1976)
 Dancer with Bruised Knees (1977)
 Pronto Monto (1978)
 Entre Lajeunesse et la sagesse (1980)
 Love Over and Over (1982)
 Heartbeats Accelerating (1990)
 Matapédia (1996)
 The McGarrigle Hour (1998)
 La vache qui pleure (2003)
 The McGarrigle Christmas Hour (2005)
 ODDiTTiES (2010)
 Tell My Sister (2011)
 Sing Me the Songs: Celebrating the Works of Kate McGarrigle (2013)
 ''Tant Le Monde: Live in Bremen, Germany, 2005 (2022)

References

1944 births
Living people
Kate & Anna McGarrigle
Canadian folk singer-songwriters
Canadian women singer-songwriters
Members of the Order of Canada
Canadian people of English descent
Canadian people of Irish descent
Canadian people of French descent
Singers from Montreal
Anglophone Quebec people
French-language singers of Canada
École des beaux-arts de Montréal alumni
20th-century Canadian women singers
21st-century Canadian women singers
McGarrigle-Wainwright-Roche family